Mom, Can I Keep Her? is a 1998 American direct-to-video comedy film written by Sean O'Bannon and directed by Fred Olen Ray.

Plot

Timmy Blair, a typical teenager befriends a 500lb gorilla.

Cast
 Gil Gerard as Reinhart
 Kevin Dobson as Dr. Joel Blair
 Alana Stewart as Eva Blair
 Justin Berfield as Timmy Blair
 Don McLeod as Zamora
 Terry Funk as Jungle Ed
 Henry Darrow as Mr. Willard
 Ted Monte as Jason
 Brinke Stevens as Jenna
 Mary Woronov as Dr. Klein
 Lori Nelson as Stephanie

References

External links
 
 

1998 films
Films directed by Fred Olen Ray
1998 comedy films
1990s English-language films